In mathematics, the Heine–Cantor theorem, named after Eduard Heine and Georg Cantor, states that if  is a continuous function between two metric spaces  and , and  is compact, then  is uniformly continuous. An important special case is that every continuous function from a closed bounded interval to the real numbers is uniformly continuous.

Proof

We want to show that  is uniformly continuous, that is, for every positive real number  there exists a positive real number  such that for all points  in the function domain ,  implies that .

Consider some positive real number .

Since  is compact, this cover has a finite subcover  where . Each of these open sets has an associated radius . Let us now define , i.e. the minimum radius of these open sets. Since we have a finite number of positive radii, this minimum  is well-defined and positive. We now show that this  works for the definition of uniform continuity.

Since the sets  form an open (sub)cover of our space , we know that  must lie within one of them, say . Then we have that . The triangle inequality then implies that

Applying the triangle inequality then yields the desired

See also 

 Cauchy-continuous function

External links
  
 

Theory of continuous functions
Metric geometry
Theorems in analysis
Articles containing proofs